Latifa Echakhch (born 1974 in El-Khnansa, Morocco) is a Moroccan-French visual artist working in Switzerland who creates installations. She participated in the Venice Biennale in 2011 and won the Marcel Duchamp Prize in 2013.

Early life and education 
Latifa Echakhch was born in Morocco in 1974 and immigrated to France at the age of three. She attended the École supérieure d'Art de Grenoble and graduated from the National School of Arts Cergy-Pontoise and the Lyon National School of Fine Arts.

Career
Echakhch began her career in 2002. In 2008, she was invited to exhibit her work at Tate Modern in London. In 2011, she participated to the Venice Biennale. She was awarded the Marcel Duchamp Prize in 2013. , director of the Musée National d'Art Moderne (Pompidou Centre), who was president of the jury, said: "Her work, between surrealism and conceptualism, questions with economy and precision the importance of symbols and reflects the fragility of modernism."

Exhibitions 

2007: Le Magasin, Grenoble
2008: Tate Modern, London
2009: Fridericianum, Kassel
2009: Latifa Echakhch – Partitures, Bielefeld.
2009: Swiss Institute Contemporary Art New York, New York
2012: Latifa Echakhch – The Birds. Project under the European Cultural Days of the ECB. Portikus, Frankfurt am Main.
2013: Latifa Echakhch – Laps, Musée d'art contemporain de Lyon, Lyon
2013: Hammer Museum, Los Angeles
2015: Latifa Echakhch – Screen Shot, Zurich Art Prize 2015, Haus Konstruktiv, Zurich.
2016: Cross Fade, The Power Plant, Toronto.
2017: Crowd Fade, İstanbul Bienali, İstanbul.
2018: Falling, Lovely and beautiful, KIOSK, Ghent.
2018: Le Jardin Mécanique, New National Museum of Monaco.
2018: Sensory Spaces 14, Museum Boijmans Van Beuningen, Rotterdam.
2019: Romance, Fondazione Memmo, Rome.
2019: Freedom and Tree, Kunsthalle Mainz.
2020: The sun and The Set, BPS22, Charleroi.
2022: The Concert, Swiss Pavilion, 59th International Art Exhibition, Venice Biennale.

Private life
Echakhch lives and works in Martigny in Switzerland.

Monographs 
 Kamel Mennour, Latifa Echakhch, texts by Jean-Christophe Ammann, Latifa Echakhch, Annabelle Gugnon, Bernard Marcadé, Zürich / Dijon, Switzerland / France, JRP | Ringier Kunstverlag / Les Presses real, 2012, 
 , Latifa Echakhch. Laps, Lyon, France, Musée d'art contemporain de Lyon, 2013,

References 

1974 births
Living people
French contemporary artists
French installation artists
Moroccan emigrants to France
Swiss contemporary artists